Ron Stablehorn is the fictitious Vice President of Marketing at Rolling Rock beer. He usually appears as part of viral marketing campaigns for the company. The Effie Award winning campaign was created by the advertising company Goodby, Silverstein & Partners.

Often, he will speak to the audience in a television commercial, stating that Rolling Rock has come under fire by loyal fans. In 2006, Ron appeared to denounce an ad where "an ape parachutes into a pool party, and dances in a suggestive manner with a sexy lady." At the commercial's end, a text statement reads "This totally unsincere apology posted by Friends of Rolling Rock". In 2007, Ron appeared a week before Super Bowl XLI to warn viewers about a possible Super Bowl ad featuring "grown men in thongs in the workplace." Ron apologized to viewers, and states that Rolling Rock is attempting to pull the upcoming ad. However, if they cannot, he hopes that it will not "in any way tarnish their great name". He appears in a follow-up commercial the next week, stating they finished the 61st of 62nd in the commercials from that day.

Ron Stablehorn has a blog on the Rolling Rock website where he personally defends his ad campaign and offers an apology to anyone who was offended by the recent ads.

In reality, the Stablehorn character is actually meant to promote the ads. His appearances, along with other advertisements denouncing upcoming ads, are part of a viral marketing campaign to draw attention to the ads.

References

External links 

Drink advertising characters
Male characters in advertising
Viral marketing